Kunzang Lhamu is a Bhutanese women rights activist and government official.

Lhamu is the  member secretary and director of National Commission of Women and Children. She did her Masters from the University of Singapore. She is a director of the International Organization for Collaborative Outcome Management.

References

Living people
University of Singapore alumni
Bhutanese activists
Year of birth missing (living people)